The 1883 Boston Beaneaters season was the thirteenth season of the franchise. The Beaneaters won their third National League pennant, their third in six years. This is also generally recognized as the year during which the team's nickname became the Boston Beaneaters.

Regular season

Season standings

Record vs. opponents

Roster

Player stats

Batting

Starters by position
Note: Pos = Position; G = Games played; AB = At bats; H = Hits; Avg. = Batting average; HR = Home runs; RBI = Runs batted in

Other batters
Note: G = Games played; AB = At bats; H = Hits; Avg. = Batting average; HR = Home runs; RBI = Runs batted in

Pitching

Starting pitchers
Note: G = Games pitched; IP = Innings pitched; W = Wins; L = Losses; ERA = Earned run average; SO = Strikeouts

Other pitchers
Note: G = Games pitched; IP = Innings pitched; W = Wins; L = Losses; ERA = Earned run average; SO = Strikeouts

References
1883 Boston Beaneaters season at Baseball Reference

Boston Beaneaters seasons
Boston Beaneaters
Boston Beaneaters
19th century in Boston
National League champion seasons